Alois Isidor Jeitteles  (20 June 1794 – 16 April 1858) was an Austrian doctor, journalist and writer, best known for Ludwig van Beethoven's setting of his poem sequence, An die ferne Geliebte.

Life 
Jeitteles was born in Brünn (now Brno), to a Jewish family with a medical and rabbinic tradition. He studied philosophy in Prague and Brünn and medicine in Vienna. In 1819 he opened a medical practice in Brünn. He published poetry in the pamphlets "Selam" (1812–1817) and "Aglaja" (1815–1832). With his cousin  he founded the Jewish weekly "Siona" in 1818.  In the same year he collaborated with Ignaz Franz Castelli on "Der Schicksalsstrumpf", a parody of the fashionable :de:Schicksalstragödie or tragedy of fate. Jeitteles made numerous translations, including the Spanish comedy Die Macht des Blutes (Spanish title: La fuerza de la sangre) by Agustin Moreto as well as several French plays.

From 1848 to his death he edited the newspaper the "Brünner Zeitung".

Jeitteles died in Brünn and was buried in Brno Jewish Cemetery.

His daughter was the suffragette :de:Ottilie Bondy (1832–1921). He also had two sons, Richard and Robert.

An die ferne Geliebte
Jeitteles's poetic sequence An die ferne Geliebte (To the Distant Beloved), written in 1815 when he was 21, was set in 1816 as a song cycle by Ludwig van Beethoven, who was acquainted with both Alois and his cousin Ignaz. Beethoven's early biographer Anton Schindler recorded that Beethoven thanked Jeitteles for the inspiration he provided, but it is not clear whether Jeitteles wrote the poems specifically for Beethoven or whether Beethoven first saw them on publication.

See also 
 Baruch Jeitteles

Notes

Publications 
 Sieg, Friede, Heimkehr. Bey Gelegenheit der ... Rückkehr ... des Kaisers, Brünn: Trailer, 1814
 Die Hausgenossen. Lustspiel, Leipzig : Andrä, 1843
 Moderne Walpurgisnacht, Brünn: C. Winiker, 1848

Sources 
 
 
 Thayer, Alexander Wheelock, rev. and edited Elliot Forbes (1967). "Thayer's Life of Beethoven". Princeton: Princeton University Press.

External links 
 

1794 births
1858 deaths
Writers from Brno
19th-century Austrian poets
Austrian male poets
Austrian medical writers
Austrian journalists
Austrian Jews
Moravian Jews
Jewish poets
19th-century Austrian physicians
Jewish physicians
People from Brno in health professions